Bogdan Dobranov (1914–1983) was a Bulgarian Catholic priest and bishop Ordinariate of the Roman Catholic Diocese of Sofia and Plovdiv.

Biography
Bogdan Dobranov Bishop was born in Plovdiv. On 23 March 1940 he was ordained a priest, and on 10 October 1959 he was elected titular bishop of Gyufi. He was consecrated bishop on 8 November 1959. On 22 July 1975 he was appointed as the Sofia - Plovdiv apostolic vicar, and on 14 December 1978 he was appointed as the Sofia - Plovdiv eparhien bishop. After his death, the Sofia - Plovdiv diocese remained without a bishop for nearly five years (SEDE VACANTE), because of the difficult political situation.

References

External links
 http://www.catholic-hierarchy.org/bishop/bdobranov.html 

1914 births
1983 deaths
20th-century Roman Catholic bishops in Bulgaria